Welsberg-Taisten is a comune (municipality) in the province of South Tyrol in northern Italy, located about  northeast of the city of Bolzano.

Geography
Welsberg-Taisten borders the following municipalities: Prags, Rasen-Antholz, Olang, Gsies, and Niederdorf.

Frazioni
The municipality of Welsberg-Taisten contains the frazioni (parishes) Ried (Novale), Wiesen (Prati), Unterrain (Riva di Sotto) and Taisten (Tesido).

History

Coat-of-arms
The emblem is quarterly argent and sable. It is the arms of the Earls of Welsberg, whose castle was in the municipality, which gave to the village its name. The emblem was adopted in 1932.

Society

Linguistic distribution
According to the 2011 census, 95.08% of the population speak German, 4.57% Italian and 0.35% Ladin as first language.

Demographic evolution

References

External links

 Homepage of the municipality

Municipalities of South Tyrol